The 1967–68 Yugoslav First League season was the 22nd season of the First Federal League, the top level association football league of SFR Yugoslavia, since its establishment in 1946. Sixteen teams contested the competition, with Red Star winning their eighth national title.

Teams
At the end of the previous season Sutjeska and Čelik were relegated. They were replaced by Proleter Zrenjanin and Maribor.

League table
No team was relegated to Second League at the end of this season in order to increase the number of First League participating teams to 18 beginning with the 1968–69 campaign.

Results

Top scorers

See also
1967–68 Yugoslav Second League
1967–68 Yugoslav Cup

External links
Yugoslavia Domestic Football Full Tables

Yugoslav First League seasons
Yugo
1967–68 in Yugoslav football